Doug Hemphill is an American sound mixer. He won two Academy Awards for Best Sound and was nominated for eight more in the same category. He has worked on more than 190 films since 1979.

Selected filmography
Hemphill has won an Academy Award for Best Sound and has been nominated for another nine:

Won
 The Last of the Mohicans (1992)
 Dune (2021)

Nominated
 Dick Tracy (1990)
 Geronimo: An American Legend (1993)
 Air Force One (1997)
 The Insider (1999)
 Master and Commander: The Far Side of the World (2003)
 Walk the Line (2005)
 Life of Pi (2012)
 Blade Runner 2049 (2017)

References

External links

Year of birth missing (living people)
Living people
American audio engineers
Best Sound Mixing Academy Award winners
Best Sound BAFTA Award winners